David Leedom Helliwell (July 26, 1935 – December 30, 1993) was a Canadian rower who competed in the 1956 Summer Olympics. He won a silver medal in a coxed eight alongside Philip Kueber, Richard McClure, Douglas McDonald, Bill McKerlich, Carlton Ogawa, Donald Pretty, Lawrence West, and Robert Wilson. He also won a silver medal in the 1958 Commonwealth Games in Australia  but this time in a coxed four. He was born in Vancouver.

References

External links
David Helliwell's profile at Sports Reference.com
Mention of David Helliwell's death
 David Helliwell at Sports Reference

1935 births
1993 deaths
Canadian male rowers
Olympic rowers of Canada
Rowers at the 1956 Summer Olympics
Olympic silver medalists for Canada
Olympic medalists in rowing
Medalists at the 1956 Summer Olympics
Rowers from Vancouver
Commonwealth Games medallists in rowing
Commonwealth Games silver medallists for Canada
Rowers at the 1958 British Empire and Commonwealth Games
Medallists at the 1958 British Empire and Commonwealth Games